Monaeses cinerascens, is a species of spider of the genus Monaeses. It is found only in Myanmar and Sri Lanka.

See also
 List of Thomisidae species

References

Thomisidae
Arthropods of Myanmar
Spiders of Asia
Spiders described in 1887